Adesmia aspera is an perennial herb which is found from central Chile to western Argentina (Mendoza, Neuquén).

References

aspera
Flora of Chile
Flora of Argentina